James Samuel Malosky Sr. (December 14, 1928 – December 4, 2011) was an American football coach.  He ranks 18th all-time in wins among college football coaches in all divisions.  He was the head football coach at the University of Minnesota Duluth (formerly known as Duluth State Teachers College) for 40 years from 1958 to 1997.  He compiled a career record of 255–125–13 and is ranked second all-time in wins among NCAA Division II football coaches.

Biography
Malosky was a native of Crosby, Minnesota, who began his coaching career at Morris and Morningside-Edina High Schools.  He was hired as the head football coach at University of Minnesota Duluth in 1958 and led the team to Minnesota Intercollegiate Athletic Conference championships in 1960, 1961 and 1973.  In 1976, the school joined the Northern Sun Intercollegiate Conference.  Malosky led the team to eight Northern Sun championships, in 1979, 1980, 1985, 1986, 1987, 1990, 1995, and 1996.   Malosky's 1980 team compiled a perfect 10–0 record, which was part of a 20-game winning streak, which "at the time was the longest in all of college football."

Malosky was forced to retire due to health concerns.  Malosky had never missed a game, practice, or teaching assignment in 40 years.  However, in May 1998, he suffered a mild stroke. He recovered from the stroke sufficiently to attend practices and games in the fall of 1998, but he realized that he "couldn't run the ship the way he had in the past."

At the time of his retirement, he was the winningest coach in NCAA Division II football history and ranked 11th among all college football coaches in all divisions.  As of 2008, he ranked 2nd among NCAA Division II coaches (behind Ken Sparks) and 18th among all college football coaches in all divisions.

Malosky was inducted into the Minnesota High School Football Coaches Association Hall of Fame in 1994, the University of Minnesota Hall of Fame in 1996, the University of Minnesota Duluth Athletic Hall of Fame in 1999, and the Northern Sun Intercollegiate Athletic Conference Hall of Fame in 2000.

In 2004, the University of Minnesota Duluth renamed its football stadium in Malosky's honor as James S. Malosky Stadium. The stadium underwent a $6.5 million renovation in 2008. At a nationally televised game on September 11, 2008, the stadium was officially dedicated to Malosky. Malosky was honored in a pre-game ceremony and received a standing ovation from the crowd.

In 2009, Malosky received the Distinguished Minnesotan Award by the Minnesota Chapter of the National Football Foundation and the College Football Hall of Fame. The award is given to individuals who have made a lifelong contribution to football in the state of Minnesota.

The Jim Malosky Coach of the Year Award, named after Malosky, is given annually to the Division II Coach of the Year.

He died December 4, 2011 due to respiratory failure.

Head coaching record

See also
 List of college football coaches with 200 wins

References

1928 births
2011 deaths
Minnesota Golden Gophers football players
Minnesota Duluth Bulldogs football coaches
High school football coaches in Minnesota
People from Crosby, Minnesota
Deaths from respiratory failure